Danielle "Danni" Stark is a fictional character from the Australian soap opera Neighbours, played by Eliza Szonert. She made her debut during the episode broadcast on 30 November 1993 and remained in the show until 13 November 1996, with a brief cameo in 2005 as part of the serial's twentieth anniversary. Danni is Cheryl Stark's daughter and suffered from diabetes. She had a complex, long-term relationship with Malcolm Kennedy.

Creation and casting
The character of Danni was created in 1993 as part of a new family; the Starks. She joined already established characters, brother Darren Stark (Todd MacDonald) and mother Cheryl Stark (Caroline Gillmer). Danni arrives with her brother, Brett (Brett Blewitt), another new addition to the serial's cast. After being a part of the Neighbours cast for almost a year, Szonert said "I'm really getting into it now, but I hated seeing myself on screen at first and the long hours and routine took a lot of getting used to."

Development
Danni arrives in Ramsay Street with Brett after they are both expelled from boarding school. Upon her arrival, Danni was described as being a "tearaway" and having a "devil-may-care" attitude. Of her character, Szonert said "Danni like to get what she wants and she can be a right little schemer. She likes to concoct plans to get her own way and can be real troublemaker." Danni can be manipulative at times, especially when she wants something. Szonert told Rochelle Tubb of The Sun-Herald that she did not share many similarities to her character, but did occasionally display some aspects of Danni's personality in real life.

Danni is diabetic. When she is caught injecting insulin with a needle, fellow residents thought she was using heroin after Michael Martin (Troy Beckwith) gossiped about her. She had previously been emotionally neglected at boarding school and decides to pretend to be an addict because she loves attention. Danni's condition becomes a problem when she and Malcolm Kennedy (Benjamin McNair) go on holiday. A flood finds them stranded without food or water causing her blood sugar levels to drop. They go out and search for food so that her diabetes does not prove fatal. Danni can be incredibly moody at times and she often leads her brother Brett astray.

Danni is not happy with Cheryl's relationship with Lou Carpenter (Tom Oliver) and she makes her feelings about the subject very clear to her mother. Szonert explained that Danni is "angry at life" and that she has not sorted out her feelings regarding her father's unexpected death. Danni initially does not like Lou interfering in her family's lives, but her relationship with Lou gradually grows better.

Departure
Szonert decided to leave the show after playing Danni for two and a half years. She felt it was time for her to move on and look for new roles. Szonert commented "I love everyone on the cast and crew. But I'm looking forward to auditioning for different roles and doing acting classes again." In early 2005, Szonert was asked to return to Neighbours for a guest appearance as part of the show's 20th anniversary. She accepted and was one of many ex-cast members who made an appearance in the episode "Friends for Twenty Years", which was broadcast on 27 July.

Storylines
Danni arrives with Brett and Cheryl moves in with them. Cheryl initially does not want her children around as she prefers to live the high life after her Lotto win. After seeing Danni inject insulin, Michael Martin spreads a rumour that she is using drugs, she plays along with this for attention. Michael is infuriated with her when she reveals the truth, but she seduces him. Danni begins a relationship with Michael, they also sleep together without contraception on one occasion. Cheryl becomes annoyed with Danni over their relationship, but she continues seeing him in secret regardless of her mother's opinion. In turn Danni makes it clear that she disapproves of Cheryl's relationship with Lou Carpenter, refusing to be happy for her mother's newfound happiness. She and Michael separate and she begins seeing Malcolm for one year. Danni believes she is in love with Mal; they later move in together to prove they are serious about one another. Their relationship crumbles after one year; upon their break-up she dates Kingston White (Simon Wilton). She later dates Ben Dalziel (Stephen Pease), Steve George (Alex Dimitriades) and Luke Handley (Bernard Curry). Danni is devastated when Cheryl is hit by a car and dies. She emotionally blackmails Luke into starting a new life with her; this along with Darren's wild behaviour against Mal, Lou and Karl makes Brett decide to leave. She later leaves after being offered a job overseas, leaving at the same time as Brett.

Reception
A writer for the BBC Online said Danni's most notable moment was "Being caught with Michael Martin in Lou and Cheryl's bed." Editor of MSN TV, Lorna Cooper, described the character's storylines as typical, stating: "Danni experienced the typical growing pains of a Ramsay Street female teen (school and boys)." Anthony Cowdy of British newspaper, The Independent, called Danni "the nubile enfant terrible of BBC1's Neighbours". Following Danni's expulsion from school, he added "In your adamant refusal to renege on your contracts to protect school bullies and other unsavoury youngsters, you had a quiet dignity that was truly attractive."

Rochelle Tubb of The Sun-Herald dubbed the character "havoc-creating". A reporter from Inside Soap criticised the character, stating "When it comes to heeding advice from others, Danni prefers to bury her head in her ego." In 2014, writers for All About Soap called for Danni's return to the show for the 30th anniversary. They said "The former wild child would definitely up the glamour stakes if she attended the big bash, and can you imagine how exciting it would be if her first love, Mal Kennedy, was there too? Sparks would be bound to fly!" They also branded Danni "our ultimate style crush".

References

External links
 Danni Stark at BBC Online
 Danni Stark on IMDb

Neighbours characters
Television characters introduced in 1993
Fictional waiting staff
Fictional bartenders
Female characters in television